Scrobipalpa aestivans is a moth in the family Gelechiidae. It was described by Mark I. Falkovitsh and Oleksiy V. Bidzilya in 2003. It is found in Uzbekistan.

References

Scrobipalpa
Moths described in 2003